Broad Creek is an unincorporated community in Sussex County, Delaware, United States. Broad Creek is named after the river of that name that drains the Bald Cypress swamps of both Trap Pond and Trussum Pond.

History
Broad Creek's population was 54 in 1900.

References

Unincorporated communities in Sussex County, Delaware
Unincorporated communities in Delaware